The 1990 Canadian Grand Prix was a Formula One motor race held on 10 June 1990 at Circuit Gilles Villeneuve. It was Race 5 of 16 in the 1990 Formula One World Championship. It was the 28th Canadian Grand Prix and the 12th to be held at the Circuit Gilles Villeneuve. The race was held over 70 laps of the 4.390 km (2.728 mi) circuit for a race distance of 307 kilometres.

The race was won for the second time by Brazilian driver Ayrton Senna driving a McLaren MP4/5B. It was Senna's third win for the season having won the season-opening United States Grand Prix and the Monaco Grand Prix just two weeks earlier. Senna won by ten seconds over fellow Brazilian Nelson Piquet who drove a Benetton B190. Three seconds further back in third was British driver Nigel Mansell driving a Ferrari 641.

The win allowed Senna to gain a twelve-point lead in the drivers' championship over his McLaren teammate Gerhard Berger. His nearest competitive rival, Ferrari driver Alain Prost had less than half of Senna's points.

Qualifying

Pre-qualifying report
In the Friday morning pre-qualifying session, Roberto Moreno was fastest by over three tenths of a second in the EuroBrun, despite a continued lack of testing. Olivier Grouillard was second fastest in the sole Osella, with the Larrousse-Lolas in third and fourth. For the first time this season, Aguri Suzuki was faster than his team-mate Éric Bernard.

In fifth place, failing to pre-qualify by a hundredth of a second, was Gabriele Tarquini in the AGS, with his team-mate Yannick Dalmas in sixth. It was the fourth double failure to pre-qualify for the French team. The other three entrants were a long way behind: Bertrand Gachot was seventh in the Coloni, nearly 16 seconds slower than Moreno. Claudio Langes had been fired by EuroBrun prior to this event, but had been reinstated; he was eighth fastest, nearly 19 seconds slower than his team-mate Moreno. Slowest again, and nearly 22 seconds off the pace, was Bruno Giacomelli, who managed seven laps in the Life before his engine failed. The team were at this point talking to Brabham and Lotus, hoping to purchase some used Judd CV engines, the same type that EuroBrun were using.

Pre-qualifying classification

Qualifying report
The qualifying session on Saturday was wet, therefore Friday's times were used to decide the grid order. Ayrton Senna was fastest in the McLaren, with his team-mate Gerhard Berger alongside him on the front row.

Qualifying classification

Race

Race report
In a race with a McLaren front row, the team looked strong. Senna maintained the lead coming into the first corner with Berger second, but the Austrian was deemed to have jumped the start. A few laps into the race it was announced that Berger would have a one-minute penalty added to his race time. As a consequence, after a round of pitstops for new tyres, Senna allowed his teammate to pass him going into the hairpin so that the Austrian could set about gaining time in relation to his competitors.

The weather conditions were moist, making for a mildly slippery track. This caused spins for many. The first of the spinners was Pierluigi Martini who spun off at turn 2 on the first lap. Thierry Boutsen, the 1989 winner, spun mid-race while trying to pass Prost approaching a corner, and hit the Ligier of Nicola Larini as he spun.

Nannini spun off the track into a tyre wall. Shortly afterwards on lap 26, Jean Alesi lost control while challenging another car and spun into the same tyre barrier, ending up on top of Nannini's abandoned Benetton B190. The Benetton was written off when hit by the Tyrrell, leaving team mechanics with a massive rebuild before the next race in Mexico.

In the end, Berger had crossed the line first but was awarded a one-minute penalty for a jumped start, which was added to his overall race time, dropping him to fourth in the final order. Following Berger's penalty, Senna took the victory, whilst Piquet finished second after a determined battle with the two Ferraris where he forced his way past Prost's Ferrari going into the hairpin. It was the Benetton driver's first podium finish since the 1988 Australian Grand Prix. Prost was later passed at the same place by teammate Mansell who went on to finish third.

Race classification

Championship standings after the race

Drivers' Championship standings

Constructors' Championship standings

 Note: Only the top five positions are included for both sets of standings.

References

External links

Canadian Grand Prix
Canadian Grand Prix
Grand Prix
Grand Prix